MS Havila Neptune is the second ship built at Havyard Leirvik AS to the Havyard 842 design, and was delivered to the shipping company Havila Shipping ASA on 19 April 2008 as yard number 94.
This Havyard design from Havyard Maritime has also become popular abroad, including in China.

References

2007 ships
Ships built in Norway
Merchant ships of Norway